Grace and Grace Foods are brand names of GraceKennedy Limited, a multinational entity involved in food processing and distribution, banking and finance, insurance and remittance services, and building materials retailing. It was established in 1922. It also licenses some products for manufacture and sale in foreign countries such as Canada, Great Britain and the United States as well as in a number of Caribbean countries. In the food industry segment, it is a noted manufacturer of Caribbean cuisine and Jamaican cuisine food products.

Grace manufactures: 
Beverages including juices and drinks made from Caribbean fruits, vegetable blends, and concentrates
Canned meats and fish 
Chips 
Coconut products 
Dairy products
Jams and jellies 
Protein drinks
Ready mixes including traditional Caribbean "favorites" 
Rice combos 
Sauces and condiments 
Spices and seasonings 
Soups 
Teas 
Veggie meals

In 2018, Grace Foods continued its breadth of U.S. operations by entering into a joint venture with Majesty Foods LLC, a Florida-based company, to operate its current factory production of its portfolio of frozen Hispanic and Caribbean products for the retail and food service channels in the U.S.

References

External links
Grace website

Food and drink companies of Jamaica
Jamaican brands
Jamaican culture
1922 establishments in the British Empire